Puranen is a Finnish surname. Notable people with the surname include:

 Antero Puranen (born 1952), Finnish Olympic javelin thrower
 Tapani Puranen (born 1957), Finnish composer
 Kimmo Puranen (born 1958), Finnish fencer 
 Leena Puranen (born 1986), Finnish football forward

Finnish-language surnames